Block Entertainment or Block Ent. Worldwide is a record label created by Russell "Block" Spencer and Andrew "Gotti" Couser. The label is known for creating southern group Boyz N Da Hood and releasing artist Yung Joc. In 2005 Block signed an exclusive joint venture deal with Warner Music Group's label Bad Boy Records. In November 2009, Block Entertainment signed a joint venture deal with Capitol Records. In 2011 the label released Gorilla Zoe's album King Kong, which features the first single "What's Going On".

Legal issues
In the spring of 2013, Yung Eaz met Atlanta producer Nitti Beatz They recorded the hit "Shut Yo Mouth". After Teaming with Russell "Block" Spencer, founder of the Block Enterprises label. Spencer signed Eaz to Capitol Records for a multi-album deal, and Capitol released Eaz's debut "Shut Yo Mouth" . Following a legal action by Capitol Records against the ReDigi.com online company in April 2013, the latter was found to be in violation of copyright law. Capitol Records claimed that ReDigi was guilty of copyright infringement due to a business model that facilitated the creation of additional copies of Capitol's digital music files, whereby users could upload the files for downloading or streaming to the new purchaser of the file. ReDigi argued that the resale of MP3/digital music files is actually permitted under certain doctrines ("fair use" and "first sale") but the court maintained that the doctrines' application "was limited to material items that the copyright owner put into the stream of commerce.

Artists

Current artists

 Kris Kelli
 48 Slim
 Courtni Renei
 Lil Flo Malcom
 Reek Maikan
 Yung Berg
 Gorilla Zoe
 Fat Joe
 Lil Xan
 BBA Trigga
bag

Former artists
Boyz N Da Hood
Young Jeezy
Big Gee
Duke
Jacquees
Rich Chiggaoc
YC
Yung Joc

References

American record labels
Indie rock record labels
Hip hop record labels